is a prefectural museum in Takamatsu, Japan, dedicated to the history and art of Kagawa Prefecture.

See also
 Sanuki Province
 List of Historic Sites of Japan (Kagawa)
 Takamatsu Castle (Sanuki)

References

External links
  The Kagawa Museum
 The Kagawa Museum at Google Cultural Institute

Museums in Kagawa Prefecture
Takamatsu, Kagawa
History museums in Japan
Art museums and galleries in Japan
Prefectural museums
Museums established in 2008
2008 establishments in Japan